Sri Mahalakshmi is a 2007 Indian Telugu language thriller film written and directed by Fightmaster Vijayan starring Srihari and Shamna.The film was produced under the banner of Srihari's Production house Sri Chalana Chitra.. The film is a remake of 2006 Malayalam film Chinthamani Kolacase starring Suresh Gopi and Bhavana.

Plot
Lakshmi Krishna Devaraya aka LK, is a famous advocate, always fights on behalf of criminals and helps them win their cases. However, LK believes that he was the envoy of God and implements the real justice after the court acquits them by killing the accused in the name of cosmic justice. His sister always encourages him in every case. In fact, LK's parents committed suicide after not receiving justice in the court for the rape of their daughter, which motivated LK to be a vigilante. Sri Mahalakshmi, an MBBS student, is the daughter of a teacher Sambamurthy. She is killed by some nine NRI girls who call themselves as the Mirchi Girls. Their parents meet LK and urge him to save their children who were fixed in a murder case. LK makes a thorough research on the subject and gets the girls acquitted. During the trial it is proved that Sri Mahalakshmi is an adopted daughter. But in his personal inquiry, LK finds that the hostel matron Olga Rose Mary, medical college principal Bhogendra Bhalla and public prosecutor Janardhan were behind Sri Mahalakshmi's death. It is Janardhan and Bhalla who raped the girl which led to her death but imposed the case on the NRI girls. Finally LK implements the cosmic justice by killing all three of the accused to deliver justice to Sri Mahalakshmi and Sambamurthy.

Cast
Srihari as Lakshmi Krishna Devaraya "LK"
Suhasini as Rajyalakshmi, LK's sister
Shamna as Sri Mahalakshmi, a college girl
Subbaraju
Sayaji Shinde as Janardhan
Thilakan as Sambamurthy, Sri Mahalakshmi's father
Venu Madhav as Guddu Chandram
Mumaith Khan
Rallapalli
Tanikella Bharani as Bavaji Rao
Raghu Babu as Prakash
Supreeth
Shanoor Sana as Olga Rose Mary
Ajay as Isra Qureshi
Aishwarya
Rajitha
Raghu Kunche as Reporter
Jeeva
Waheeda Rehman as Waheeda Rehman, a Mirchi Girl

References

2000s Telugu-language films
Telugu remakes of Malayalam films
2007 thriller films
2000s vigilante films
Indian thriller films
Indian vigilante films
2007 films
Films scored by Mani Sharma